Kill Switch (also known as Redivider) is an 2017 science fiction film, directed by Tim Smit in his directorial debut, from a screenplay by Charlie Kindinger and Omid Nooshin. It stars Dan Stevens,  Bérénice Marlohe, Tygo Gernandt, Charity Wakefield, Bas Keijzer, Mike Libanon, and Mike Reus.

The film was released on June 16, 2017 by Saban Films.

Plot
Sometime in the near future, physicist and former NASA pilot Will Porter is recruited by Alterplex, a power company that has built a massive tower that taps into unlimited quantum energy. It is revealed that it is destroying a mirror universe Earth referred to as "The Echo" and that the inhabitants there also have an energy tower. Strange gravity anomalies and unexplained deaths are occurring in The Echo world that are blamed on the tower, as it takes energy from that world. There was supposed to be no life there but due to a malfunction, the device created a true mirror Earth full of life, and now both Earths face destruction unless one is destroyed within less than a day.

Porter has been sent to The Echo with a cube device called the "Redivider" believing it will balance the power transfer between the two universes and set things right. Instead, he learns the device is a kill switch that will destroy The Echo forcing him to decide which universe to sacrifice in order to save the other. The armies in The Echo know this and are trying to arrest or kill him. There is also a group of "anti-tower rebels" who are actively fighting the armed forces of the towers.

Cast
 Dan Stevens as Will Porter
 Bérénice Marlohe as Abigail Vos
 Tygo Gernandt as Michael
 Charity Wakefield as Mia Porter
 Bas Keijzer as Bektman
 Mike Libanon as Hugo
 Mike Reus as Dr. Klintsen

Production
In February 2016, it was announced Dan Stevens and Bérénice Marlohe had been cast in the film, with Tim Smit directing the film, from a screenplay by Charlie Kindinger and Omid Nooshin. Aaron Ryder will serve as a producer on the film under his FilmNation Entertainment banner.

Don Diablo wrote, scored and performs in the film's theme song, "Echoes".

Release
In February 2017, Saban Films acquired distribution rights to the film. It was theatrically released on June 16, 2017 and on VOD by Lionsgate Home Entertainment on August 22, 2017.

Reception

Box office
Kill Switch grossed a worldwide total of $163,348. Sales of its DVD/Blu-ray releases cashed $140,269.

Critical response
On review aggregator Rotten Tomatoes, the film holds an approval rating of 9% based on 22 reviews, with an average rating of 4.5/10. On Metacritic, the film holds a weighted average score of 31 out of 100, based on 8 critics, indicating "generally unfavorable reviews".

References

External links
 
 

2017 films
Dutch science fiction films
American science fiction films
2017 directorial debut films
FilmNation Entertainment films
Films shot from the first-person perspective
Films about parallel universes
2010s English-language films
2010s American films